The Breboaia is a right tributary of the Mara in Maramureș County, Romania. It discharges into the Mara in Hărnicești.

References

Rivers of Romania
Rivers of Maramureș County